The Voice Kids is a British television music competition to find new singing talent. The third series began airing on 8 June 2019, being broadcast on a weekly basis on ITV. As with the previous two series, it was hosted by Emma Willis. Danny Jones, Pixie Lott and will.i.am returned as coaches and were joined by a fourth coach, Jessie J, who was previously a coach on the adult version of the show. Sam Wilkinson won the competition and Danny Jones was the winning coach.

Teams

Colour key:
  Winner
  Finalist
  Eliminated in the Semi-final
  Eliminated in the Battles

Blind auditions
Colour key

Episode 1 (8 June)

Episode 2 (15 June)

Episode 3 (22 June)

Episode 4 (29 June)

Battle rounds

Colour key

Episode 1 (6 July)

Episode 2 (13 July)

Show details

Results summary
Team's colour key
 Team Will
 Team Jessie
 Team Pixie
 Team Danny

Result's colour key
 Artist received the most public votes
 Finalist
 Artist was eliminated

Semi-final (20 July)

Live final (27 July)
Each artist performed a duet alongside their coach in addition to their main performance.
Group performances: The Coaches ("Faith")
Musical guests: Little Mix ("Bounce Back")

References

External links

The Voice UK
2019 British television seasons